Riverside is a city in and the county seat of Riverside County, California, United States, in the Inland Empire metropolitan area. It is named for its location beside the Santa Ana River. It is also part of the Greater Los Angeles area. Riverside is the 61st-most-populous city in the United States and 12th-most-populous city in California. As of the 2020 census, it had a population of 314,998. Along with San Bernardino, Riverside is a principal city in the nation's 13th-largest Metropolitan Statistical Area (MSA); the Riverside-San Bernardino-Ontario MSA (pop. 4,599,839) ranks in population just below San Francisco (4,749,008) and above Detroit (4,392,041).

Riverside was founded in the early 1870s. It is the birthplace of the California citrus industry and home of the Mission Inn, the nation's largest Mission Revival Style building. It is also home to the Riverside National Cemetery and the Eastern Division of the Federal District Court for the Central District of California.

The University of California, Riverside, is in the northeastern part of the city. The university hosts the Riverside Sports Complex. Other attractions in Riverside include the Fox Performing Arts Center, Museum of Riverside, which houses exhibits and artifacts of local history, the California Museum of Photography, the California Citrus State Historic Park, Castle Park, and the Parent Washington Navel Orange Tree, the last of California's two original navel orange trees.

History

In the late 18th century and the early 19th century, the area was inhabited by Cahuilla and the Serrano people. Californios such as Bernardo Yorba and Juan Bandini established ranches during the first half of the 19th century.

In the 1860s, Louis Prevost launched the California Silk Center Association, a short-lived experiment in sericulture.  In the wake of its failure, John W. North purchased some of its land and formed the Southern California Colony Association to promote the area's development. In March 1870, North distributed posters announcing the formation of a colony in California. North, a staunch temperance-minded abolitionist from New York State, had formerly founded Northfield, Minnesota. Riverside was temperance-minded, and Republican. There were four saloons in Riverside when it was founded. The license fees were raised until the saloons moved out of Riverside. Investors from England and Canada transplanted traditions and activities adopted by prosperous citizens. As a result, the first golf course and polo field in southern California were built in Riverside.

The first orange trees were planted in 1871, with the citrus industry Riverside is famous for beginning three years later (1874) when Eliza Tibbets received three  Brazilian navel orange trees sent to her by a personal friend, William Saunders, a horticulturist at the United States Department of Agriculture in Washington, D.C. The trees came from Bahia, Brazil. The Bahia orange did not thrive in Florida, but its success in southern California was phenomenal.

The three trees were planted on the Tibbets' property. One of them died after it was trampled by a cow during the first year it was planted. After the trampling, the two remaining trees were transplanted to property belonging to Sam McCoy to receive better care than L.C. Tibbets, Eliza's husband, could provide. Later, the trees were again transplanted, one at the Mission Inn property in 1903 by President Theodore Roosevelt (this tree died in 1922), and the other at the intersection of Magnolia and Arlington avenues. Eliza Tibbets was honored with a stone marker placed with the last tree. That tree still stands to this day inside a protective fence abutting what is now a major intersection.

The trees thrived in the southern California climate and the navel orange industry grew rapidly. Many growers purchased bud wood and then grafted the cuttings to root stock. Within a few years, the successful cultivation of many thousands of the newly discovered Brazilian navel orange trees led to a California Gold Rush of a different kind: the establishment of the citrus industry, which is commemorated in the landscapes and exhibits of the California Citrus State Historic Park and the restored packing houses in the downtown's Marketplace district. By 1882, there were more than half a million citrus trees in California, almost half of which were in Riverside. The development of refrigerated railroad cars and innovative irrigation systems established Riverside as the richest city in the United States (in terms of income per capita) by 1895.

As the city grew, a small guest hotel designed in the popular Mission Revival style, known as the Glenwood Tavern, eventually grew to become the Mission Inn, favored by presidents, royalty and movie stars. Inside was housed a special chair made for the sizable President William Howard Taft. The hotel was modeled after the missions built along the California coast by Franciscan friars in the 18th and 19th centuries. (Although Spanish missionaries came as far inland as San Bernardino–San Bernardino de Sena Estancia—east of Riverside, there was no actual Spanish mission in what is now Riverside.) Postcards of lush orange groves, swimming pools and magnificent homes have attracted vacationers and entrepreneurs throughout the years. Many relocated to the warm, dry climate for reasons of health and to escape Eastern winters. Victoria Avenue, with its scattering of elegant turn-of-the-century homes, and citrus-lined paseo, serves as a reminder of European investors who settled here.

Geography
Riverside is the 61st-largest city in the United States, the 12th-largest city in California, and the largest city in California's Inland Empire metro area. Hills within the city limits include Mount Rubidoux, a city landmark and tourist attraction. Riverside is surrounded by small and large mountains, some of which get a dusting of winter snow. Many residents also enjoy the many beaches of Southern California. Riverside is about a  drive to the Pacific Ocean and is close to Orange County and Los Angeles County.

Cityscape

Landmarks

Riverside is home to the historic Mission Inn, the Beaux-Arts style Riverside County Historic Courthouse (based on the Petit Palais in Paris, France), and the Riverside Fox Theater, where the first showing of the 1939 film Gone with the Wind took place. The theater was purchased by the city and refurbished as part of the Riverside Renaissance Initiative. The Fox Theater underwent extensive renovation and restoration, which was completed in 2009, to turn the old cinema into a performing arts theater. The building was expanded to hold 1,600 seats and the stage was enlarged to accommodate Broadway-style performances. In January 2010, singer Sheryl Crow opened the newly remodeled Fox Theater in a nearly sold-out show.

Riverside is the home of the "World's Largest Paper Cup" (actually made of concrete), which is over three stories (68.10 ft; 20.76 m) tall. The "Dixie Cup" landmark is on Iowa Street just north of Palmyrita, in front of what was once the Dixie Corporation's manufacturing plant (now closed down).

Three notable hills are in Riverside's scenic landscape: Box Springs Mountain, Evans (Jurupa) Hill and Tecolote Hill; all of which are preserved open spaces. South of Riverside is Lake Mathews. There is also the well-known landmark/foothill Mount Rubidoux, which is next to the Santa Ana River and one of the most noticeable landmarks in the downtown area. This foothill is the dividing line between the town of Rubidoux and the city of Riverside.

March Joint Air Reserve Base borders Riverside on the east serving as a divider between the city and Moreno Valley. March ARB, founded in 1918, is the oldest operating Air Force base west of the Mississippi River.

At the entrance to Riverside from the 60 freeway sits Fairmount Park. This extensive urban oasis was designed by the firm founded by Frederick Law Olmsted, which had designed New York's Central Park. It includes a lovely stocked pond that is home to many species of birds. On nearby private land is the former site of Spring Rancheria, a Cahuilla village.

Neighborhoods

The city of Riverside has 28 designated "neighborhoods" within the city limits. These include Airport, Alessandro Heights, Arlanza, Arlington, Arlington Heights, Arlington South, Canyon Crest, Casa Blanca, Downtown, Eastside, Grand, Hawarden Hills, Hillside Hunter Industrial Park, La Sierra, La Sierra Acres, La Sierra Hills, La Sierra South, Magnolia Center, Mission Grove, Northside, Orangecrest, Presidential Park, Ramona, Sycamore Canyon Park, Sycamore Canyon Springs, University, Victoria and Wood Streets.

East of downtown is the originally named "Eastside". which grew out of a colonia inhabited by Mexican immigrant workers in the orange groves, other orchards and produce fields. The area these people lived in was originally a settlement called La Placita that predated the city, being founded in 1843. Mexican communities were also formed in the barrio of Casa Blanca during the early 20th century.

Annexations
The City Council has proposed many annexations of nearby unincorporated communities that would increase Riverside's population and land area significantly. Most notable is the Lake Hills/Victoria Grove area, which would extend the city's southwestern borders to Lake Mathews.

Current proposals

 97 Berry Road
 103 Barton/Gem
 104 I-215 Corridor
 105 Sycamore/Central
 106 East Blaine
 107 Alta Cresta Remainder
 108 Lake Hills/Victoria Grove
 111 University City
 112 Kaliber
 113 Barton/Station

Potential annexations
 A Center Street
 B Highgrove
 C Spring Mountain Ranch (92)
 D Canyon Ridge
 E Woodcrest
 F Gateway

Features

Riverside is home to the University of California, Riverside. The UCR Botanical Gardens contains  of unusual plants, with four miles (6 km) of walking trails. The city prides itself on its historic connection to the navel orange, which was introduced to North America from Brazil in 1874. Riverside is home to the one surviving Parent Navel Orange Tree, from which all American West Coast navel orange trees are descended.

There are three hospitals in Riverside.
 Riverside Community Hospital is a General Acute Care Hospital with Basic Emergency Services and a Level I Trauma Center as of 2020.
 Parkview Community Hospital Medical Center is a General Acute Care Hospital with Basic Emergency Services as of 2006.
 Kaiser Foundation Hospital – Riverside is a General Acute Care Hospital with Basic Emergency Services as of 2006.

Riverside is also home to the Riverside Public Library system. Branches include: Arlanza, Arlington, La Sierra, Marcy, Main, Orange Terrace, Eastside Cybrary, and Casa Blanca.

Convention facilities are available at several locations. Also available is the Riverside Marriott with  indoors, and the Mission Inn with  indoors and  outdoors. All three facilities are located within walking distance of one another in downtown Riverside. Meetings with an academic focus are also held at the University of California, Riverside.

Cemeteries
Cemeteries in Riverside include:
 Crestlawn Memorial Park; notable burials include Medal of Honor recipient George Alan Ingalls, baseball player Mike Darr, actor Roland Harrah III, and actor Darwood Kaye.
 Evergreen Cemetery; notable burials include Marcella Craft, Frank Augustus Miller, John W. North, Eliza Tibbets, and Al Wilson.
 Olivewood Memorial Park; notable burials include Medal of Honor recipient Jesus S. Duran, Travis Alexander, Dorothy Burgess, Mayor Ben H. Lewis, Del Lord, Gloria Ramirez, and Eric Show.
 Riverside National Cemetery, established in 1976, is the largest cemetery managed by the National Cemetery Administration, and since 2000 has been the most active in the system based on the number of interments.
 Sherman Indian High School Cemetery, Home Gardens

Climate
Riverside experiences a semi-arid climate (Köppen climate classification BSh) bordering on an arid climate (Köppen climate classification BWh) with hot, dry summers and mild, relatively wet winters. On average, Riverside receives  of precipitation annually, with measurable precipitation occurring on 35 days, with almost all of it between November and April, with February the wettest month.

Environment
The Riverside area faces issues of smog and above-average levels of air pollution. In a comparison by the National Campaign Against Dirty Air Power (2003), the Riverside-San Bernardino-Ontario area was found to be one of the most polluted regions based on year-round particle measurements when compared to other U.S. cities. The city made efforts to reduce pollution by incorporating additional means of mass transit (Metrolink) and equipping its entire fleet of buses with natural gas. Smog decreased considerably over the next few years as local municipalities and counties worked with the South Coast Air Quality Management District to implement measures to improve regional air quality. In 2020, the American Lung Association rated Riverside County one of the nation's worst counties for smog. Most of Riverside's smog problems are the result of the prevailing wind patterns that blow the smog from the Los Angeles Basin and particulates generated by southern California's multitude of vehicles, and the Port of Los Angeles and Port of Long Beach into the Inland Empire.

Demographics

2010

As of the 2010 census reported that Riverside had a population of 303,871. The racial makeup of Riverside was 171,669 (56.5%) White, 21,421 (7.0%) African American, 3,467 (1.1%) Native American, 22,566 (7.4%) Asian (1.7% Filipino, 1.6% Chinese, 1.1% Korean, 1.0% Vietnamese, 1.0% Indonesian, 0.1% Japanese, 0.1% Pakistani), 1,219 (0.4%) Pacific Islander, 68,111 (22.4%) from other races, and 15,418 (5.1%) from two or more races. Hispanic or Latino of any race were 148,953 persons (49.0%); 41.8% of Riverside's population is Mexican, 1.1% Guatemalan, 1.0% Salvadoran, 0.7% Puerto Rican, 0.3% Cuban, 0.2% Nicaraguan, and 0.2% Colombian. Non-Hispanic Whites were 34.0% of the population in 2010, down from 82.1% in 1970.

The Census reported that 292,322 people (96.2% of the population) lived in households, 8,925 (2.9%) lived in non-institutionalized group quarters, and 2,624 (0.9%) were institutionalized.

There were 91,932 households, out of which 38,939 (42.4%) had children under the age of 18 living in them, 45,398 (49.4%) were opposite-sex married couples living together, 13,845 (15.1%) had a female householder with no husband present, 6,372 (6.9%) had a male householder with no wife present. There were 6,392 (7.0%) unmarried opposite-sex partnerships, and 746 (0.8%) same-sex married couples or partnerships. 18,284 households (19.9%) were made up of individuals, and 6,262 (6.8%) had someone living alone who was 65 years of age or older. The average household size was 3.18. There were 65,615 families (71.4% of all households); the average family size was 3.67.

The population was spread out, with 81,406 people (26.8%) under the age of 18, 47,126 people (15.5%) aged 18 to 24, 82,482 people (27.1%) aged 25 to 44, 66,615 people (21.9%) aged 45 to 64, and 26,242 people (8.6%) who were 65 years of age or older. The median age was 30.0 years. For every 100 females, there were 97.6 males. For every 100 females age 18 and over, there were 95.4 males.

The homeowner vacancy rate was 2.4%; the rental vacancy rate was 7.4%. 168,888 people (55.6% of the population) lived in owner-occupied housing units and 123,434 people (40.6%) lived in rental housing units.

According to the 2010 United States Census, Riverside had a median household income of $56,403, with 17.5% of the population living below the federal poverty line.

2000

As of the census of 2000, there were 255,166 people, 82,005 households, and 58,141 families residing in the city. The population density was 1,261.5/km2 (3,267.2/mi2). There were 85,974 housing units at an average density of 425.0/km2 (1,100.8/mi2). The racial makeup of the city was 59.3% White, 7.4% African American, 1.1% Native American, 5.68% Asian, 0.4% Pacific Islander, 21.0% from other races, and 5.1% from two or more races. 38.1% of the population were Hispanic or Latino of any race.

There were 82,005 households, out of which 39.8% had children under the age of 18 living with them, 50.3% were married couples living together, 14.8% had a female householder with no husband present, and 29.1% were non-families. 21.5% of all households were made up of individuals, and 7.2% had someone living alone who was 65 years of age or older. The average household size was 3.02 and the average family size was 3.54.

In the city, the population was spread out, with 30.1% under the age of 18, 12.9% from 18 to 24, 30.0% from 25 to 44, 18.0% from 45 to 64, and 9.0% who were 65 years of age or older. The median age was 30 years. For every 100 females, there were 97.1 males. For every 100 females age 18 and over, there were 93.6 males.

The median income for a household in the city was $41,646, and the median income for a family was $47,254. Males had a median income of $36,920 versus $28,328 for females. The per capita income for the city was $17,882. 15.8% of the population and 11.7% of families were below the poverty line. Out of the total population, 18.9% of those under the age of 18 and 8.0% of those 65 and older were living below the poverty line.

Religion

Riverside is largely Christian and is home to Catholic, Eastern Orthodox, Church of Jesus Christ of Latter Day Saints, Protestant, and Universalist Unitarian churches, an Islamic mosque, Jewish synagogue, Hindu temple, and several Buddhist temples. Riverside is also home to the Inland Empire Atheists and Agnostics organization.

Large Seventh-Day Adventist populations, due to La Sierra University, are located in Riverside and proximity to Loma Linda near San Bernardino.

There is also a large Mormon population, as well as in the San Bernardino area, as the Church of Jesus Christ of Latter-day Saints has missions in Riverside and Redlands near their temple.

Several religious celebrations take place on top of the city's Mount Rubidoux.  One is an annual Easter Sunrise service, which is the nation's oldest continual non-denominational outdoor Easter service The 100th anniversary of the event was held April 12, 2009.  Each December, a 2½-mile (4 km) procession from Our Lady of Guadalupe Shrine to the top of Mount Rubidoux promotes awareness of Juan Diego's walk up Tepeyac hill, in 1531, where he reportedly saw a Marian apparition known as Our Lady of Guadalupe.

In 2012, a controversy erupted regarding the cross atop Mount Rubidoux, which was on city-owned land and maintained by the city. Due to constitutional issues regarding separation of church and state, the Riverside City Council sold the cross and the land under it (0.43 acres; 1740.15 sq m) to a private entity for $10,500.

Economy

Riverside's economy consists largely of light-industry and generates a range of products including aircraft components, automotive parts, gas cylinders, electronic equipment, food products, and medical devices. Supporting the manufacturing sector are several industrial parks, including those in the Hunter Industrial Park, Sycamore Canyon Industrial Park and Airport Industrial Areas. As the county seat of Riverside County and the most populous city in the Inland Empire, Riverside also houses several legal, accounting, engineering, and banking firms. Citrus production and packing houses still exist within the city, but the industry is in decline.

American electronics company Bourns, Inc. is among the companies based in Riverside.

Citrus is in decline in many areas of the Inland Empire where urbanization and water scarcity have made the industry uneconomic.

Top employers
According to the City's 2018 Comprehensive Annual Financial Report, the top employers in the city are:

Film and television

Riverside's close proximity to Hollywood, combined with its many unique architectural features, has made it a frequent filming choice by film studios, starting with the 1919 film Boots, which starred Dorothy Gish and was filmed at the Mission Inn.

Episodes of the 2013 television celebrity diving program Splash are taped at Riverside Community College's aquatics complex, and a local gay bar named V.I.P. was the setting for the second episode of Season Five of the Bravo TV reality show Tabatha Takes Over. The HBO show Enlightened (2011–2013), which starred Laura Dern, was also set in Riverside.

Retail
Retail shopping centers include the open-air Riverside Plaza, and the Galleria at Tyler mall. The Main Street Pedestrian Mall in downtown is the site of several unique shops.

Arts and culture

Museums

 California Citrus State Historic Park Museum
 The Cheech Marin Center for Chicano Art, Culture & Industry 
 Entomology Research Museum at the University of California, Riverside (not open to the public).
 Heritage House Museum
 March Field Air Museum
 Mission Inn Museum
 Riverside Art Museum
 Museum of Riverside
 Sherman Indian Museum at the Sherman Indian High School
 Sweeney Art Gallery, an extension of the University of California, Riverside
 The Stahl Center Museum of Culture at the La Sierra University
 University of California, Riverside California Museum of Photography
 World Museum of Natural History at the La Sierra University
Southern California Railway Museum

Festivals and events

Several festivals occur throughout the year in Riverside, many focused on the downtown area.

Each year in February The Riverside Dickens Festival is held to "enhance a sense of community among citizens of Riverside County and Southern California by creating a series of literary events and to provide educational, family-oriented, literary entertainment and activities such as plays, musical performances, pageants, living history presentations, workshops, lectures, classroom study, exhibits and a street bazaar with free entertainment, vendors and costumed characters."

The Riverside Airshow takes place in March at the Riverside Municipal Airport.

The March Field Airfest, also known as Thunder Over the Empire, is a biennial air show held at March Air Reserve Base. The air show is among the largest events in the Inland Empire and Riverside County. The show has featured such performers as the United States Air Force Thunderbirds, the Air Combat Command demonstrations teams and many other military and civilian demonstrations. 2010 saw the Patriots Jet Team as the highlight demonstration team of the show. Attendance for the 2010 show was estimated at over 150,000.

The Riverside International Film Festival (RIFF) takes place in April and features films from around the world.  Sponsored by the city of Riverside, local universities, and many businesses, past festivals have featured over 175 films.

Old Riverside Foundation, a local nonprofit focused on historic preservation of the built environment, hosts an annual Vintage Home Tour in May that showcases private historic homes, open to the public for one day only.

In October, the California Riverside Ballet sponsors the Ghost Walk, which in 2013 celebrated its 22nd year. The event is a walk around some of the city's oldest and most historic buildings, with volunteers leading tours and telling ghost stories.

Also, in October, for one evening, from late afternoon until midnight, the Long Night of Arts & Innovation is held in Downtown Riverside. This event is designed to showcase the area's talent in the visual and performing arts, science and technology from its universities, community college, school districts, and innovative companies and arts organizations. It is also designed to encourage school children to seek careers in the arts and STEM fields (science, technology, engineering, mathematics) by connecting them to professors, artists, professionals and performers from these institutions.

The Riverside Festival of Lights centers around The Mission Inn Hotel & Spa, located downtown. Decoration of the Inn begins in October and a lighting ceremony that includes speakers, fireworks, and live musicians takes place the day after Thanksgiving Day. Carolers, horse-drawn carriage rides, and ice skating all color the festival. Restaurants, cafes, and community groups all contribute to the festival. The festival runs through New Year's Day.

Also during the week of Thanksgiving, the Festival of Trees is held at the Riverside Convention Center. Held since 1990, the event seeks to raise money for the Riverside County Regional Medical Center children's units including the Neonatal Intensive Care Unit, the Child Abuse and Neglect Unit, and the Pediatric Intensive Care Unit. Attracting 25,000 people per year, the event has raised over $5 million since its inception. At the Festival of Trees, many professionally decorated Christmas trees are judged, auctioned, and then displayed for public viewing.

Government

Local government
Riverside is governed by a mayor and city council. The mayor is elected in a citywide election. The city council has seven members, each elected from single member wards. A city manager is responsible for ongoing city services.

In Riverside's Comprehensive Annual Financial Report for the fiscal year ended June 30, 2013, the city's government accounts were reported to have $244 million in revenues and $365 million in expenditures, with the deficiency made up by the issuance of long-term debt and transfers from the city-owned utilities (including electric and water).  The report also indicates that over the prior nine years, the number of city employees increased by 23.6% to 2,686 FTE, outpacing the 12.5% increase in the number of residents.

Federal and state representation
Under the electoral maps drawn by the Citizens' Redistricting Commission, which were first used in the 2022 elections and will remain in effect through at least 2030, Riverside's state and federal legislative districts have changed substantially.

In the California State Assembly, it is split between the 58th Assembly District, represented by Democrat Sabrina Cervantes and the 63rd Assembly District, represented by Republican Bill Essayli. 

In the United States House of Representatives, Riverside is represented by Democrat Mark Takano in the 39th Congressional District. In the United States Senate, California is represented by Democrats Dianne Feinstein and Alex Padilla.

Courts

 Federal
 United States District Court, Central District of California, Eastern Division
 United States Bankruptcy Court, 9th Circuit Bankruptcy Appellate Panel
 United States Bankruptcy Court, Central District of California

 State
 California Court of Appeal, Fourth District, Division Two
 Superior Court of California, County of Riverside

Crime
Riverside's crime rate has shown a drop over the past several years.  According to the FBI's Uniform Crime Reporting Statistics database, from 2002 to 2014 violent crime fell to 1,384 from 2,026 events, and property crime to 9,864 from 13,135 events. During this time, the population of the city rose by 21%.  To help reduce gang-related crime, the city developed Project Bridge, an anti-gang program under the city of Riverside's Park and Recreation Department.  Gang activity has been reported to center in the Casa Blanca, Arlanza and Eastside neighborhoods.

Of the 60 largest U.S. police departments in 2015, the Riverside Police Department was the only department whose police did not kill anyone that year.

Education

Colleges and universities

Institutions of higher learning include:
 California Baptist University
 California Southern Law School (to close in 2020).
 La Sierra University
 National University (branch campus in Riverside)
 Riverside City College
Riverside Royals College
 University of California, Riverside

Vocational schools
 Brightwood College
 UEI College
 Platt College
 American College of Healthcare
 Masters Vocational College
 US College
 Northwest College

Secondary schools

Public school districts and high schools
Riverside is served by two school districts:
 Riverside Unified School District serves eastern Riverside.
 High schools include:
 Arlington High School
 Martin Luther King High School
 John W. North High School
 Riverside Polytechnic High School also known as Poly High School
 Ramona High School
 Riverside Virtual School
 Riverside STEM High School
 Continuation high schools include:
 Abraham Lincoln High School (continuation)
 Raincross High School (continuation)
 Summit View High School (continuation)
 Alvord Unified School District serves western Riverside.
 High schools include:
 La Sierra High School
 Norte Vista High School
 Hillcrest High School
 Continuation high schools include:
 Alvord High School (continuation)

Other public secondary schools
Two notable institutions of learning, for specified student bodies, are also located in Riverside:
 California School for the Deaf, Riverside (CSDR) for the Deaf and Hard of Hearing from Preschool to 12th grade has been open since 1952.
 Sherman Indian High School of the Bureau of Indian Education, is for Native American tribal members from 9th to 12th grade; it has been open since 1878.

Private secondary schools
 Bethel Christian School
 Eastside Christian Academy
 Harvest Christian school
 La Sierra Academy (Seventh-day Adventist)
 Notre Dame High School (Roman Catholic)
 Riverside Christian High School
 Woodcrest Christian High School
 Islamic Academy of Riverside 
Carniege Schools Riverside

Initiative to raise college graduation rates
Riverside won a $3 million grant from the Bill and Melinda Gates Foundation in 2010. As a result, the Completion Counts initiative was created as a joint partnership by the city of Riverside, Riverside City College, Alvord Unified School District, Riverside Unified School District, Riverside County Office of Education, UC Riverside, and the Greater Riverside Chambers of Commerce to double college graduation rates by 2020. Only Riverside, New York City, San Francisco, and Mesa, Arizona received such a grant.

The partnership is creating measures that help students across Riverside earn a degree. For example, RCC will now give 2012 graduates of AUSD and RUSD priority class registration, and a two-year guarantee to complete an associate degree or transfer to a four-year university. Completion Counts is also ensuring that AUSD, RUSD and RCC work together to create a seamless math and English curriculum to prepare students for college-level work. High school and college student counselors are meeting regularly to agree on the best ways to get students ready for college.

Media

Riverside is the home to the Fox Performing Arts Center. The theater is best known for being the first theater to screen the most successful film in box-office history when adjusted for inflation, the 1939 film Gone with the Wind.

Transportation

Highways
Riverside is served by three major freeways: I-215, State Route 60, and State Route 91. These three freeways meet in northeastern Riverside at a multi-level interchange that was rebuilt in 2007.

Rail lines

The city contains three Metrolink commuter rail stations: Riverside-Downtown, Riverside-La Sierra, and Riverside-Hunter Park/UCR. The first two are both served by the Inland Empire-Orange County and 91/Perris Valley lines, and the Downtown station is served by the Riverside Line on weekdays, and the San Bernardino Line on weekends. The Hunter Park station is served by the 91/Perris Valley Line on weekdays only. Amtrak's Southwest Chief, which runs from Los Angeles to Chicago, also serves the city.

Bus lines
Local bus service is provided by the Riverside Transit Agency. Intercity bus service is provided by Omnitrans Greyhound Lines, Amtrak California, and a handful of small operators serving the cross-border market into Mexico.

Airports
The nearest airport for commercial airline service is Ontario International Airport in Ontario, California. The Riverside Municipal Airport is an airport within Riverside city limits, but it does not have commercial airline service. It is primarily used for private aviation and is also the location for the annual Riverside Air Show.

Notable people

Sister cities

The Sendai Committee is working on setting up a secure e-pal system whereby the residents of Sendai and Riverside can exchange emails in a fashion similar to pen pals. The aim is to promote grassroots cultural exchange between the two sister cities.

The city of Riverside established an economic partnership program with the state of Oaxaca, Mexico, in the early 2000s.

See also
 California Riverside Ballet
 Largest cities in southern California
 Ranchos of California
 Saint Andrew Orthodox Christian Church
 List of U.S. cities with large Hispanic populations

References

Bibliography
 Brown Jr, John and James Boyd. History of San Bernardino and Riverside Counties; With Selected Biography of Actors and Witnesses of the Period of Growth and Achievement, 3 volumes, The Western Historical Association, 1922. The Lewis Publishing Company, Chicago.
 Gunther, Jane Davies. Riverside County, California, Place Names; Their Origins and Their Stories, Riverside. 1984. .
 Patterson, Tom. A Colony For California; Riverside's First Hundred Years. Second Edition 1996. The Museum Press of the Riverside Museum Associates, Riverside. .
 Patterson, Tom. Landmarks of Riverside; and the Stories Behind Them. 1964. Press~Enterprise Co., Riverside. .

Citations and notes

Further reading
 Durian, Hal (2013). True Stories of Riverside and the Inland Empire. Charleston, SC: The History Press. . 
 Hall, Joan H. (2003). Cottages, Colonials and Community Places of Riverside, California. Riverside, CA: Highgrove Press. . 
 Klotz, Esther H.; Hall, Joan H. (2005). Adobes, Bungalows, and Mansions of Riverside, California. Riverside, CA: Highgrove Press. . 
 Klotz, Esther H. (1972). Riverside and the Day the Bank Broke. Riverside, CA: Rubidoux Press.

External links

 
 Riverside History
 
 

 
Cities in Riverside County, California
County seats in California
Populated places on the Santa Ana River
Incorporated cities and towns in California
Inland Empire
Populated places established in 1883
1883 establishments in California
Chicano and Mexican neighborhoods in California